Souls of Totality is a 2018 British-American short film directed by Richard Raymond and starring Tatiana Maslany and Tom Cullen.

Cast
Tatiana Maslany as Lady 18
Tom Cullen as Guy 3
Helen Shaver as Shepherd One

Release
The film premiered at the 2018 HollyShorts Film Festival.

Reception
Alan Ng of Film Threat awarded the film 7.5 stars out of 10.

Accolades
The film won the Best Grand Jury Award at the HollyShorts Film Festival and the Best Short Film award at the Raindance Film Festival.

References

External links
 

2018 films
2018 short films
American short films
British short films
2010s English-language films